Volleyball has been a Pan Arab Games event since the second edition in 1957 in Beirut, Lebanon.

Indoor Volleyball

Men's tournaments

Summaries 

 A round-robin tournament determined the final standings.

Medal summary

Women's tournaments

Summaries 

 A round-robin tournament determined the final standings.

Participating nations

Beach volleyball

Summaries

External links 
 Volleyball at the Pan Arab Games - goalzz.com

 
Sports at the Pan Arab Games
Pan Arab Games
Volleyball competitions in Asia
Pan